Nový Život is a village and municipality in the Dunajská Streda District in the Trnava Region of south-west Slovakia.

Component villages

Geography
The municipality lies at an altitude of 121 metres and covers an area of 22.484 km².

History
In the 9th century, the territory of Nový Život became part of the Kingdom of Hungary. The area where the village is located was first mentioned in 1238 under the Hungarian name Altolutoljafeuld (literally: last land on its other side), whilst the most ancient form of its name was recorded  as Elyasvata in 1353.

Outer rural areas preserve the names of erstwhile villages which disappeared over the centuries. Szerhásháza, mentioned in 1464 as Esterháza was the age-old estate of the Esterházy, while Salamon was that of the Illésházy Hungarian noble families. The name Szentpéterföldje (St. Peter’s Land) shows that the one time village had a church consecrated in honour of St. Peter.

Until the end of World War I, it was part of Hungary and fell within the Somorja district of Pozsony County. After the Austro-Hungarian army disintegrated in November 1918, Czechoslovak troops occupied the area. After the Treaty of Trianon in 1920, the village officially became part of Czechoslovakia. In November 1938, the First Vienna Award granted the area to Hungary and it was held by Hungary until 1945. After Soviet occupation in 1945, Czechoslovak administration returned and the village became officially part of Czechoslovakia in 1947. The current Slovak name of the municipality means "New Life" and was given by the communist authorities in 1960, when the four component villages were unified to form the present-day municipality. The Slovak name of Illésháza had earlier been Eliášovce.

Demography 
In 1910 the village had 571, for the most part, Hungarian inhabitants. At the 2001 Census the recorded population of the village was 2048 while an end-2008 estimate by the Statistical Office put the villages's population at 2,212. As of 2001, 85.25% of its population were Hungarians while 11.82% were Slovaks. Roman Catholicism is the majority religion of the village, its adherents numbering 93.21% of the total population.

References

External links
Hungarian primary school website 
Website of local football club FC Nový Život (FC Illésháza) 

Villages and municipalities in Dunajská Streda District
Hungarian communities in Slovakia